The Maurice Farman MF.7 Longhorn is a French biplane developed before World War I which was used for reconnaissance by both the French and British air services in the early stages of the war before being relegated to service as a trainer.

Design and development

The "Longhorn" is a three bay biplane with a forward elevator mounted on upcurved extensions of the landing skids and an empennage carried on four booms consisting of biplane horizontal stabilisers with an elevator attached to the trailing edge of the upper surface and twin rudders.  The airframe was constructed using a combination of ash and silver spruce, and many of the members including the outer interplane struts and the outrigger booms carrying the tail surfaces are hollow. 
It is powered by a Renault air-cooled V8 engine driving a pusher propeller mounted at the back of a fabric-covered nacelle.  The propeller is mounted on the engine's camshaft, and therefore revolves at half the engine speed. Its name was derived from the distinctive front-mounted elevator and elongated skids.

The design originated with Maurice Farman's second aircraft, which was built in 1910. The wings had rounded ends and the outer pair of interplane struts were fabric covered to form voisin-style side curtains. The undercarriage was also of Voisin pattern, with a pair of mainwheels mounted on trailing arms below the skids. Lateral control was effected by ailerons mounted on the lower wings only. Pitch control was effected solely by a front-mounted elevator, the tail surfaces consisting of biplane fixed stabilising surfaces and twin rudders. The gap between the wings was 1.5 m (5 ft).

The side curtains were soon removed, and subsequent aircraft, including that flown by Maurice Tabateau to win the 1910 Coupe Michelin, had square-ended wings and modified tail surfaces, with an elevator added to the upper rear stabiliser.

The 1911 Maurice Farman aircraft flown to win the Michelin Puy de Dôme prize had an increased wingspan, the upper wing spanning 16 m (52 ft 6 in) and the lower 14.5 m (47 ft 7 in).  Ailerons were mounted on both upper and lower wings.  The undercarriage now had two pairs of wheels attached to the skids using elastic cords.

The Maurice Farman is the subject of a detailed technical description in the issue of Flight dated 6 July 1912. This describes it as a new type, but also notes that in essence the design was at least two years old.  The aircraft described differs from earlier aircraft principally in having a 2 m (6 ft 7 in) gap between the wings.

Operational history

Early civil flights

Early versions of the design were used for instruction purposes at Maurice Farman's flying school at Buc.

On October 28, 1910 Maurice Tabateau won the Coupe Michelin prize by flying  in 6 hr 1 min 35 s 

On 7 March 1911 Eugène Renaux flew an example to win the Michelin Prize offered for a passenger-carrying flight from Paris to the summit of the Puy de Dôme.

This was one of the two aircraft entered by Maurice Farman for the French military aircraft competition held in November 1911.

Military use

The Australian Flying Corps (AFC), provided with the MF.7 by the British Indian Army, operated it during the Mesopotamian campaign of 1915–16.
Some Maurice Farman 7 were sold to Spain and served with the Servicio de Aeronáutica Militar since 1913.
Four MF.7s were sold to Norway and served with the Norwegian Army Air Service.
MF.7s were used by the Imperial Japanese forces in the World War I Battle of Tsingtao, with one downed by the German force's sole working aircraft. This was the first documented downing of an aeroplane in battle.
A Greek example was converted to a hydroplane flown by Michael Moutoussis with Aristeidis Moraitinis as observer and carried out the world's first air-naval co-operation mission during the First Balkan War.

Operators

Royal Flying Corps
No. 2 Squadron RFC
No. 3 Squadron RFC
No. 4 Squadron RFC
No. 5 Squadron RFC
No. 6 Squadron RFC
No. 7 Squadron RFC
No. 9 Squadron RFC
No. 15 Squadron RFC
No. 30 Squadron RFC
No. 41 Squadron RFC
 
Australian Flying Corps
Central Flying School AFC at Point Cook, Victoria
Mesopotamian Half Flight

Corpo Aeronautico Militare

Spanish Air Force

Mexican Air Force

French Air Force

Belgian Air Force

Norwegian Army Air Service operated four aircraft until the late 1920s

Imperial Japanese Navy Air Service

Royal Danish Air Force
 Makhnovshchina
Air Fleet of the Revolutionary Insurgent Army of Ukraine

Imperial Russian Air Service

Royal Hellenic Navy
Royal Hellenic Air Force

Survivors

 Musée de l'Air et de l'Espace, Paris
 Norsk Teknisk Museum, Oslo
 Greek War Museum in Athens, Greece

Specifications (MF.7)

See also

References

Bibliography

Further reading

External links

 Luftfahrtmuseum
  Contemporary technical description of the MF.7 with photographs and drawings.

MF.07
1910s French sport aircraft
1910s French military trainer aircraft
1910s French military reconnaissance aircraft
Aircraft first flown in 1912
Single-engined pusher aircraft
Canard aircraft
Biplanes